The genus Neacomys, also known as bristly mice because of their spiny fur, includes several species of rodents in the tribe Oryzomyini of family Cricetidae. It is most closely related to Oligoryzomys, Oreoryzomys, and Microryzomys. Neacomys species are mainly found in the Amazon basin, but N. pictus occurs in Panama and N. tenuipes in montane Colombia.

Species 
There are currently about 19 described species in the genus.
Neacomys aletheia  — upper Juruá bristly mouse
Neacomys amoenus  — pleasant bristly mouse
Neacomys dubosti  — Dubost's bristly mouse
Neacomys guianae — Guiana bristly mouse
Neacomys elieceri — Eliecer's bristly mouse 
Neacomys jau — Jaú bristly mouse
Neacomys macedoruizi — Macedo Ruiz's bristly mouse
Neacomys marajoara — Marajó bristly mouse
Neacomys minutus — small bristly mouse
Neacomys musseri — Musser's bristly mouse
Neacomys paracou — Paracou bristly mouse
Neacomys pictus — painted bristly mouse
Neacomys rosalindae — Rosalind's bristly mouse
Neacomys serranensis 
Neacomys spinosus — large bristly mouse
Neacomys tenuipes — narrow-footed bristly mouse
Neacomys vargasllosai — Vargas Llosa's bristly mouse
Neacomys vossi — Voss's bristly mouse
Neacomys xingu — Xingu bristly mouse

References

Literature cited
Musser, G.G. and Carleton, M.D. 2005. Superfamily Muroidea. Pp. 894–1531 in Wilson, D.E. and Reeder, D.M. (eds.). Mammal Species of the World: a taxonomic and geographic reference. 3rd ed. Baltimore: The Johns Hopkins University Press, 2 vols., 2142 pp. 
Weksler, M. 2006. Phylogenetic relationships of oryzomyine rodents (Muroidea: Sigmodontinae): separate and combined analyses of morphological and molecular data. Bulletin of the American Museum of Natural History 296:1–149.

 
Rodent genera
Taxa named by Oldfield Thomas